The 2012 World Series by Renault was the eighth season of Renault Sport's series of events, with four different championships racing under one banner. Consisting of the Formula Renault 3.5 Series, Eurocup Formula Renault 2.0, the Eurocup Mégane Trophy and Eurocup Clio, the World Series by Renault ran at seven different venues, where fans could get into the meetings for no cost whatsoever, such is the uniqueness of the series.

The series began on 5 Nay at the Ciudad del Motor de Aragón in Alcañiz, and finished on 21 October at the Circuit de Catalunya, just outside Barcelona. Round at Monza was dropped.

Race calendar
 Event in light blue is not part of the World Series, but is a championship round for the Formula Renault 3.5 Series.

Championships

Formula Renault 3.5 Series

Eurocup Formula Renault 2.0

Eurocup Mégane Trophy

Eurocup Clio

References

 Linked articles contain additional references.

External links
 Official website of the World Series by Renault

Renault Sport Series seasons